Alabama Heritage is a nonprofit educational quarterly history magazine first published during the summer of 1986. It is published by the University of Alabama, the University of Alabama at Birmingham, and the Alabama Department of Archives and History. The magazine was conceived with a broad conception of "heritage," incorporating more than traditional history. Issues include articles about archaeology, architecture, anthropology, religion, folk arts, literature, and music. Alabama Heritage, through support from Blue Cross and Blue Shield, is available in every school in the state of Alabama.

History 

 In 1985, Bill Barnard, then-chair of the University of Alabama's history department, first broached the idea of a state history magazine and recruited Suzanne Wolfe to run with it. The first issue rolled out in the summer of 1986.
 In the mid-1990s, proration caused severe strains on the state's education budgets. Out of money and in danger of an issue not being delivered, the community came to the magazine's rescue.
 Currently the magazine is funded by the University of Alabama, the University of Alabama at Birmingham, and the Alabama Department of Archives and History, as well as a "Friends of Alabama Heritage," which has been a key pillar of the magazine's long-term survival.
 The magazine was formerly housed at the Kilgore House, which was part of the Bryce Hospital in Tuscaloosa, Alabama, and considered to be haunted. The editors of the magazine invited paranormal experts to record activity.
 Alabama Heritage announced the appointment of Rebecca Todd Minder as its new Director as of October 2021.

Community Impact 

Alabama Heritage's award-winning feature writing has made an impact in historic preservation (see "Places in Peril" below) and also in politics. Alabama Governor Robert Bentley signed the Scottsboro Boys Act in 2013, which finally and officially exonerated the Scottsboro Boys (nine African-American teens, wrongfully convicted of raping two white women in 1931. Only one was pardoned before his death.) The Alabama Heritage feature on the Scottsboro Boys -- "Awaiting Justice: The Improbable Pardon of 'Scottsboro Boy' Clarence Norris" by Tom Reidy (Issue 105, Summer 2012) —was handed to Gov. Bentley with a plea for a pardoning from Sheila Washington, director of Scottsboro Boys Museum and Cultural Center. Also, Sherman W. White Jr., one of the Tuskegee Airmen was finally honored after an article in Alabama Heritage magazine prompted his hometown of Montgomery, Alabama, to create a historic marker in his honor.

Becoming Alabama 

In 2010, Alabama Heritage—in partnership with the Summersell Center for Study of the South, the University of Alabama Department of History, and the Alabama Tourism Department—created a regular department in Alabama Heritage magazine as a part of the statewide "Becoming Alabama" initiative—a cooperative venture of state organizations to commemorate Alabama's experiences related to the Creek War, the Civil War, and the civil rights movement. Quarter by quarter, the Becoming Alabama  stories detail the corresponding seasons 200, 150, and 50 years ago—sometimes describing pivotal events, sometimes describing daily life, but always illuminating a world in flux.

Places in Peril 

Inspired by the National Trust's yearly listing of "America's Most Endangered Historic Places," a handful of Alabama preservationists decided to develop a similar roster for their own state. The initial list of ten sites, then referred to as "Alabama's Most Endangered Properties," came out in 1994, first as a media release, then as a full article in the fall issue of Alabama Heritage magazine. Annually since then—in a joint undertaking between the Alabama Historical Commission, the Alabama Trust, and Alabama Heritage—more threatened landmarks have been highlighted in the feature now called "Places in Peril."  These 216 properties represent a broad array of places depicting Alabama's story from prehistoric times to the civil rights struggles of the 1960s. Of the 216 properties listed as Places in Peril in the past twenty years, approximately 59 are no longer endangered, and 35 have been destroyed. The verdict is still out on the remaining 122 sites. Some of the success stories may have had a connection to being listed. Locust Hill in Tuscumbia, for example, was on the market when it was included in Places in Peril in 2004. The media attention given to the site inspired a couple to purchase the building as their home. In 1998 the Queen City Pool in Tuscaloosa was abandoned with an uncertain future. Today, the property has been restored as the Mildred Westervelt Warner Transportation Museum. The annual list has encouraged property owners, city officials, local organizations, and potential buyers to preserve these properties and keep them viable.

References

Further reading 

 U.S. Department of Transportation Federal Highway Administration. Innovative Financing Tip for Communities at Their Wit's End, "Innovative Financing Tip for Communities at Their Wit's End". Published 2011-04-07
 Hollis, Tim. See Alabama First: The Story of Alabama Tourism, The History Press (2013), 978-1609494889.
 Higdon, David and Brett J. Talley. Haunted Tuscaloosa, The History Press (2012), 978-1609495732.
 Birmingham Genealogy. Alabama Heritage article: Brookside: A Wild West Town", Birmingham Genealogical Society "Alabama Heritage article: 'Brookside: A Wild West Town'". Published 2013-07-24
 Beitelman, T.J. Wait, wait: Who Does This "Jennifer Horne" Think She Is? "Wait, wait: Who Does This 'Jennifer Horne' Think She Is?". 
 Duncan, Andy. Alabama Curiosities: Quirky Characters, Roadside Oddities & Other Offbeat Stuff, Globe Pequot; Second edition (2009), 978-0762749317.
 Geological Survey of Alabama. State Fossil of Alabama "State Fossil of Alabama". 
 Auburn University Economic & Community Development Institute. Alabama Economic Development Resource Directory, Auburn University & Alabama Cooperative Extension System "Alabama Economic Development Resource Directory". 
 BhamWiki. Charles Kilgore residence, Auburn University & Alabama Cooperative Extension System "Charles Kilgore residence". 
 Dialog. Campus Landmark: The Kilgore House, The University of Alabama "Charles Kilgore residence". Published 2012-08-13
 Sledge, John S. A Legendary Penman: John S. Sledge catches up with one of the Gulf Coast's most prolific authors, the illustrious Winston Groom, Mobile Bay Magazine "A Legendary Penman: John S. Sledge catches up with one of the Gulf Coast's most prolific authors, the illustrious Winston Groom". Published 2013-05
 Perazzo, Peggy. Alabama Stories Tombstones, Stone Quarries and Beyond "Alabama Stories Tombstones". Published 2013-06-08
 Places in Peril, Alabama Trust for Historic Preservation "Places in Peril". Published 2013
 Armstrong, Meredith. Kilgore House demolition underway in Tuscaloosa Monday, WVTM-TV "Kilgore House demolition underway in Tuscaloosa Monday". Published 2013-05-20
 Reynolds, Kelvin. Oldest building on UA's campus to be demolished, WSFA-12 "Oldest building on UA's campus to be demolished". Published 2013-05-20
 Alabama Women's Hall of Fame. Tallulah Brockman Bankhead "Tallulah Brockman Bankhead". 
 "Bridging the Gulf -- The Alabama-Cuba Connection" Society Mobile-La Habana "Bridging the Gulf -- The Alabama-Cuba Connection".
 Brock, John Brightman. New Archives director wants Alabamians involved in their history Alabama Living Magazine "New Archives director wants Alabamians involved in their history".

External links
www.AlabamaHeritage.com

1986 establishments in Alabama
History magazines published in the United States
Magazines established in 1986
Magazines published in Alabama
Quarterly magazines published in the United States